35th Infantry Regiment may refer to:
 35th Infantry Regiment (United States)
 35th Infantry Regiment (France)